Judith Arias Taylor is a female beach volleyball player from Dominican Republic, who played with Yndys Novas in the 2003 Pan American Games in Santo Domingo, Dominican Republic. They finished in the 9th position.

References

External links
 BV Info Profile

Year of birth missing (living people)
Living people
Dominican Republic beach volleyball players
Women's beach volleyball players
Beach volleyball players at the 2003 Pan American Games
Pan American Games competitors for the Dominican Republic